Frederick IX (11 March 1899 – 14 January 1972) was King of Denmark from 1947 to 1972. Born into the House of Glücksburg, Frederick was the elder son of King Christian X and Queen Alexandrine of Denmark. He became crown prince when his father succeeded as king in 1912. As a young man, he was educated at the Royal Danish Naval Academy. In 1935, he was married to Princess Ingrid of Sweden and they had three daughters, Margrethe, Benedikte and Anne-Marie. During Nazi Germany's occupation of Denmark, Frederick acted as regent on behalf of his father from 1942 until 1943. Frederick became king on his father's death in early 1947. During Frederick IX's reign Danish society changed rapidly, the welfare state was expanded and, as a consequence of the booming economy of the 1960s, women entered the labour market. The modernization brought new demands on the monarchy and Frederick's role as a constitutional monarch. Frederick IX died in 1972, and was succeeded by his eldest daughter, Queen Margrethe II.

Birth and family

Prince Frederick was born on 11 March 1899 at his parents' country residence, the Sorgenfri Palace, located on the shores of the small river Mølleåen in Kongens Lyngby north of Copenhagen on the island of Zealand in Denmark, during the reign of his great-grandfather King Christian IX. His father was Prince Christian of Denmark (later King Christian X), the eldest son of Crown Prince Frederick and Princess Louise of Sweden (later King Frederick VIII and Queen Louise). His mother was Alexandrine of Mecklenburg-Schwerin, a daughter of Frederick Francis III, Grand Duke of Mecklenburg-Schwerin and Grand Duchess Anastasia Mikhailovna of Russia.

He was baptised at Sorgenfri Palace on 9 April 1899. The young prince had 21 godparents, among them his great-grandfather Christian IX of Denmark, Nicholas II of Russia, George I of Greece, Oscar II of Sweden and Norway, his grandfather Crown Prince Frederick of Denmark, the Prince of Wales (later King Edward VII of the United Kingdom) and his uncle Frederick Francis IV, Grand Duke of Mecklenburg-Schwerin.

Frederick's only sibling, Knud, was born one year after Frederick. The family lived in apartments in Christian VIII's Palace at Amalienborg Palace in Copenhagen, in Sorgenfri Palace near the capital and in a summer residence, Marselisborg Palace in Aarhus in Jutland, which Frederick's parents had received as a wedding present from the people of Denmark in 1898. In 1914, the King also built the villa Klitgården in Skagen in Northern Jutland.

Early life

Christian IX died on 29 January 1906, and Frederick's grandfather Crown Prince Frederick succeeded him as King Frederick VIII. Frederick's father became crown prince, and Frederick moved up to second in line to the throne.

Just six years later, on 14 May 1912, King Frederick VIII died, and Frederick's father ascended the throne as King Christian X. Frederick himself became crown prince. On 1 December 1918, as the Danish–Icelandic Act of Union recognized Iceland as a fully sovereign state in personal union with Denmark through a common monarch, Frederick also became crown prince of Iceland (where his name was officially spelled Friðrik). However, as a national referendum established the Republic of Iceland on 17 June 1944, he never succeeded as king of Iceland.

Frederick was educated at the Royal Danish Naval Academy (breaking with Danish royal tradition by choosing a naval instead of an army career) and the University of Copenhagen. Before he became king, he had acquired the rank of rear admiral and he had had several senior commands on active service. He acquired several tattoos during his naval service.

In addition, with his great love of music, the king was an able piano player and conductor.

Marriage and issue

In the 1910s, Alexandrine considered the two youngest daughters of her cousin Tsar Nicholas II, Grand Duchess Maria Nikolaevna of Russia and Grand Duchess Anastasia Nikolaevna of Russia, as possible wives for Frederick,  until the execution of the Romanov family in 1918. In 1922, Frederick was engaged to Princess Olga of Greece and Denmark, his second cousin. They never wed.

Instead, on 15 March 1935, a few days after his 36th birthday, he was engaged to Princess Ingrid of Sweden (1910–2000), a daughter of Crown Prince Gustaf Adolf (later King Gustaf VI Adolf of Sweden) and his first wife, Princess Margaret of Connaught. They were related in several ways. In descent from Oscar I of Sweden and Leopold, Grand Duke of Baden, they were double third cousins. In descent from Paul I of Russia, Frederick was a fourth cousin of Ingrid's mother. They married in Stockholm Cathedral on 24 May 1935. Their wedding was one of the greatest media events of the day in Sweden in 1935, and among the wedding guests were the King and Queen of Denmark, the King and Queen of Belgium and the Crown Prince and Crown Princess of Norway.

Upon their return to Denmark, the couple were given Frederick VIII's Palace at Amalienborg Palace in Copenhagen as their primary residence and Gråsten Palace in Northern Schleswig as a summer residence.

Their daughters are:
 Queen Margrethe II of Denmark, born 16 April 1940, married to Count Henri de Laborde of Monpezat and has two sons
 Princess Benedikte of Denmark, born 29 April 1944, married to Richard, 6th Prince of Sayn-Wittgenstein-Berleburg and has three children
 Princess Anne-Marie of Denmark, born 30 August 1946, married to King Constantine II of Greece and has five children

Reign

From 1942 until 1943, Frederick acted as regent on behalf of his father who was temporarily incapacitated after a fall from his horse in October 1942.

On 20 April 1947, Christian X died, and Frederick succeeded to the throne. He was proclaimed king from the balcony of Christiansborg Palace by Prime Minister Knud Kristensen.

Frederick IX's reign saw great change. During these years, Danish society shook off the restrictions of an agricultural society, developed a welfare state, and, as a consequence of the booming economy of the 1960s, women entered the labour market. In other words, Denmark became a modern country, which meant new demands on the monarchy.

In 1948, one year into the king's reign, the Faroe Islands obtained home rule and became a self-governing country within the Danish Realm.

Changes to the Act of Succession
As King Frederick IX and Queen Ingrid had no sons, it was expected that the king's younger brother, Prince Knud, would inherit the throne, in accordance with Denmark's succession law (Royal Ordinance of 1853).

However, in 1953, an Act of Succession was passed, changing the method of succession to male-preference primogeniture (which allows daughters to succeed if there are no sons). This meant that his daughters could succeed him if he had no sons. As a consequence, his eldest daughter, Margrethe, became heir presumptive. By order of 27 March 1953 the succession to the throne was limited to the issue of King Christian X.

Death and funeral

Shortly after the King had delivered his New Year's Address to the Nation at the 1971/72 turn of the year, he became ill with flu-like symptoms. After a few days rest, he suffered cardiac arrest and was rushed to the Copenhagen Municipal Hospital on 3 January. After a brief period of apparent improvement, the King's condition took a negative turn on 11 January, and he died 3 days later, on 14 January, at 7:50 pm surrounded by his immediate family and closest friends, having been unconscious since the previous day.

Following his death, the King's coffin was transported to his home at Amalienborg Palace, where it stood until 18 January, when it was moved to the chapel at Christiansborg Palace. There the King was placed on castrum doloris, a ceremony largely unchanged since introduced at the burial of Frederick III in 1670, and the last remaining royal ceremony where the Danish Crown Regalia is used. The King then lay in state for six days until his funeral, during which period the public could pay their last respects.

The funeral took place on 24 January 1972, and was split in two parts. First a brief ceremony was held in the chapel where the king had lain in state, where the Bishop of Copenhagen, Willy Westergaard Madsen, said a brief prayer, followed by a hymn, before the coffin was carried out of the chapel by members of the Royal Life Guards and placed on a gun carriage for the journey through Copenhagen to Copenhagen Central Station. The gun carriage was pulled by 48 seamen and was escorted by honor guards from the Danish Army, Air Force, and Navy, as well as honor guards from France, Sweden, United Kingdom, and the United States.

At the Copenhagen Central Station, the coffin was placed in a special railway carriage for the rail journey to Roskilde. The funeral train was pulled by two DSB class E steam engines. Once in Roskilde, the coffin was pulled through the city by a group of seamen to Roskilde Cathedral where the final ceremony took place. Previous rulers had been interred in the cathedral, but it was the King's wish to be buried outside.

Succession 
He was succeeded by his eldest daughter, Queen Margrethe II. Queen Ingrid survived her husband by 28 years. She died on 7 November 2000. Her remains were interred alongside him at the burial site outside Roskilde Cathedral.

Legacy
On 20 April 1982, a statue of King Frederick IX dressed in the uniform of an admiral was unveiled by the Copenhagen harbour on the 35th anniversary of his accession to the throne in 1947 and in the tenth year after his death.

The Crown Prince Frederick Bridge which spans the Roskilde Fjord between the town of Frederikssund and the peninsula of Hornsherred, as well as the Frederick IX Bridge which spans the Guldborgsund strait between the islands of Falster and Lolland, are both named after Frederick IX.

The Crown Prince Frederick Range in Greenland was named after him when it was first mapped by Sir Martin Lindsay in 1934 during the British Trans-Greenland Expedition.

Titles, styles and honours

Titles and styles
 9 April 1899 – 14 May 1912: His Royal Highness Prince Frederick of Denmark
 14 May 1912 – 1 December 1918: His Royal Highness The Crown Prince of Denmark
 1 December 1918 – 17 June 1944: His Royal Highness The Crown Prince of Denmark and Iceland
 17 June 1944 – 20 April 1947: His Royal Highness The Crown Prince of Denmark
 20 April 1947 – 14 January 1972: His Majesty The King of Denmark

Honours
Danish honours
 Knight of the Elephant, 14 May 1912
 Cross of Honour of the Order of the Dannebrog, 11 March 1917
 Grand Commander of the Dannebrog, 3 February 1936
 King Christian IX Centenary Medal
 King Frederik VIII Centenary Medal
 Navy Long Service Award

Foreign honours

Ancestors

References

Citations

Bibliography

External links

 The Royal Lineage at the website of the Danish Monarchy
 Frederik IX at the website of the Royal Danish Collection at Amalienborg Palace
 

1899 births
1972 deaths
People from Lyngby-Taarbæk Municipality
20th-century monarchs of Denmark
House of Glücksburg (Denmark)
Crown Princes of Denmark
Burials at Roskilde Cathedral
Danish people of German descent

Grand Commanders of the Order of the Dannebrog
Knights Grand Cross of the Order of the Falcon
Recipients of the Cross of Honour of the Order of the Dannebrog
Extra Knights Companion of the Garter
Honorary Knights Grand Cross of the Royal Victorian Order
Recipients of the Grand Star of the Decoration for Services to the Republic of Austria
Recipients of the Order of George I
Grand Crosses of the Order of Saints George and Constantine
Knights Grand Cordon of the Order of Chula Chom Klao
Recipients of the Order of the Netherlands Lion
Grand Crosses with Diamonds of the Order of the Sun of Peru
Sons of kings